Exiguobacterium indicum is a Gram-positive, psychrophilic, non-spore-forming, alkaliphilic, rod-shaped and motile bacterium from the genus of Exiguobacterium which has been isolade from the Hamta glacier.

References

Bacillaceae
Bacteria described in 2006